Statistics of Scottish Football League in season 1975–76.

Scottish Premier Division

Scottish First Division

Scottish Second Division

See also
1975–76 in Scottish football

References

 
Scottish Football League seasons